Lake Neusiedl, or Fertő is the largest endorheic lake in Central Europe, straddling the Austrian–Hungarian border.

Water level fluctuations 
In the past, rainfall and aridity caused significant floods (which in 1768 enlarged the lake to its maximum documented size of ) and significant decreases in the lake's level, although frequently there seemed to be no apparent connection with the weather situation.

Stratigraphy shows that the lake bed has totally dried up at least 100 times since its formation (18,000–14,000 BC). During recent history the lake's complete disappearance has been documented in considerable detail on several occasions, e.g. in 1740–1742, 1811–1813, and most recently in 1866, when the private diary of a local, Gottlieb Wenzel, noted that he crossed the bed of the lake on 4 June without soiling his boots. Parts of the lake bed were claimed for agriculture; wheat and turnips were being planted. However, in 1871 the lake began to return and by the spring of 1876 it had already reassumed its usual size. The last (brief and partial) vanishing took place during the summer of 1949 when the northern part of the lake bed (to the approximate latitude of Podersdorf) fell dry for a few weeks. Each time the drying-up of the lake bed caused major environmental disruptions because the humidifying and temperature buffering effect of the large water body was absent, and because the winds blew large amounts of salty dust into the surrounding villages. On earlier occasions the lake was sometimes referred to as a "swamp", suggesting a very low water level with an expansion of reeds throughout the lake bed. Two records dated to 1318 and 1324, respectively mention a "river", implying that at this time the lake might have been reduced to a central body of water running from north to south.

However, comparatively minor fluctuations of the lake's level continue to occur. The water level decreased to a similar extent, by  within one year as a result of the drought of 2003. However, the lake remains sensitive to changes in its equilibrium, as recent climate change scenario simulations have shown.

Before the regulation works of the 19th century, the lake extended in the southeast to the marshlands of the Hanság which have been increasingly drained and claimed for agriculture from the 16th century onward. Originally, the lake was thus closely connected to the Danube and the Rába river systems.

Nature and wildlife 
Most of the lake is surrounded by reeds which serve as a habitat for wildlife (making the lake an important resting place for migratory birds) and are harvested in winter as soon as the ice is solid enough. This serves a double purpose, one ecological (removal of the bulk of organic matter that would otherwise decay in the lake) and one economic (the reed is sold for various purposes, mostly related to construction and housing). During the summer months, there are occasional reed fires, as dry reed is easily flammable, and fires spread quickly because of the almost constant wind.  Water quality is determined by temperature, wind, and by the amount of salt and mud emanating with the ground water from the sediments.

Several plans for dams and other intrusive construction works which would have destroyed the lake and its biotopes were discussed during the first half of the 20th century but came to nothing. Detailed plans to divide the lake bed with earthworks so that certain parts with reasonably fertile soil could be permanently drained and claimed for agriculture while the remaining parts would be used for intensive aquaculture had been finalized and approved in 1918 but were abandoned when most of the lake became Austrian territory after World War I. In 1971 plans for a bridge across the Austrian part of the lake were thwarted by environmentalists.

In 1993 the National Park Neusiedler See-Seewinkel gained international acceptance as an IUCN Category II preserve. In 2001 the national parks in Austria and Fertő-Hanság in Hungary were together accepted as a World Heritage Site. Lake Neusiedl See and its surrounding areas in Austria also enjoy protection through the Ramsar Convention on Wetlands.

Mammals
Over 40 mammal species have been recorded from the area, including the European ground squirrel, the steppe polecat and the European hamster.

Birds
In the area over 300 bird species have been recorded. Of these, around 150 breed, representing around 40% of the European and 80% of all Austrian bird species. The area contains one of the largest breeding populations of great egrets, with up to 700 pairs. There are also around 35 pairs of grey heron and 70 pairs of great bustard. One of the best known bird species in the area is the white stork, which is seen as a symbol of the region. Other species present include Eurasian spoonbill, purple heron, eastern imperial eagle, white-tailed eagle, greylag goose, golden oriole, European bee-eater, pied avocet, ruff, Kentish plover, common tern, common redshank, black-tailed godwit, Eurasian curlew, western yellow wagtail, short-eared owl, Montagu's harrier and many others which are of interest to local and visiting birdwatchers.

Fish
Native fish species include the pike, zander, European carp and wels catfish, alongside numerous minnows, such as stickleback, common bleak, white bream, common bream and ruffe. The European eel is not native to the lake, but was introduced as a food source for humans. Due to environmental concerns, further releases of young eels has been recently banned. The Prussian carp has also been introduced to the lake, alongside the pumpkinseed.

Herptiles
The European tree frog is a common species in the area. Other amphibians that can be found, especially in the reed belt and the lakeside edge, include common toad, European green toad, common spadefoot, moor frog, agile frog, pool frog, marsh frog, edible frog and the European fire-bellied toad. Danube crested newt and smooth newt are also present.

Reptiles are represented by the grass snake and a number of lizard species including the European green lizard, sand lizard and the common lizard. Occasionally, dice snakes may be seen, but the meadow viper, which was previously identified around the lake, has not been seen since 1973.

Towns and villages around the lake 
Traces of human settlement around Lake Neusiedl go back to the neolithic period. The area became densely populated from the 7th century BC onward, initially by people of the Hallstatt culture and remained so throughout Roman times. In 454 Theodoric the Great, the preeminent king of the Ostrogoths, was born here. Near Fertőrákos there are two Roman villas and a 3rd-century Mithras temple open to visitors.

The more important extant towns lying on the lake's shore are Illmitz (Illmic), Podersdorf am See (Pátfalu), Weiden (Védeny), Neusiedl am See (Nezsider), Jois (Nyulas), Winden (Sásony), Breitenbrunn (Fertőszéleskút), Purbach am Neusiedlersee (Feketeváros), Donnerskirchen (Fertőfehéregyháza), Oggau (Oka), Rust (Ruszt) and Mörbisch (Fertőmeggyes) in Austria, and Sopron, Fertőrákos, Fertőboz, Fertőd, Balf and Fertőújlak in Hungary, with the communities of Illmitz, Apetlon (Mosonbánfalva) and Podersdorf am See forming the so-called Seewinkel (lake corner), which is located between the lake and the Hungarian border. Hungarian names of Austrian towns lying on the lake's shore are given in parentheses.

Gallery

Tourism 
Despite remaining a protected wildlife habitat, the region of Lake Neusiedl, particularly in its Austrian part, draws significant numbers of tourists. The lake is known as the "Sea of the Viennese", as it offers ample opportunities for sailing and windsurfing at a reasonable distance from Vienna. There is also some commercial fishing.

Low water levels pose a problem for sailing and commercial shipping, as boats hit the ground more frequently and mooring sites can become temporarily unusable. However, it somewhat facilitates the annual freestyle mass crossing of the lake from Mörbisch to Illmitz.

See also 
 Wulka
 List of lakes
 List of World Heritage Sites in Austria

References

External links 
   
  Lake Neusiedl at funiq.hu 

Neusiedl
World Heritage Sites in Austria
World Heritage Sites in Hungary
Ramsar sites in Hungary
Ramsar sites in Austria
Biosphere reserves of Austria
Biosphere reserves of Hungary
Neusiedl am See District
Eisenstadt-Umgebung District
Geography of Győr-Moson-Sopron County
Sopron
Austria–Hungary border
Neusiedl
Neusiedl
Neusiedl
Tourist attractions in Burgenland